Barsaat (English: Rain) is a 1949 Indian Hindi-language film directed by Raj Kapoor. The film stars the famous duo of Kapoor and Nargis as well as Prem Nath. It was also the introduction of actress Nimmi in her first film role. Barsaat was one of the first major hit films directed by Kapoor. This success allowed Kapoor to buy RK Studios in 1950. This was Raj Kapoor's second directional venture after Aag. Barsaat became the highest-grossing movie in Indian cinema at the time of its release beating Mehboob Khan's Andaz which released 2 months earlier.

Plot
The film revolves around two love stories. Pran (Raj Kapoor) and Reshma (Nargis) and Gopal (Prem Nath) and Neela (Nimmi). Two friends with opposite personalities, the rich but sensitive Pran and the womanizing Gopal both have affairs with two mountain girls while holidaying in the valley of Kashmir. While Pran and Reshma's love is true and reciprocated, Gopal is a womanizing villain, who disregards the faithful Neela (Nimmi) and condemns her to wait faithfully for his return with the barsaat (rainy season).
Many plot intrigues follow through with Pran and Reshma facing many trials on the path to true love, including parental opposition, accidents, and an attempted forced marriage of Reshma to an uncouth fisherman. The couple are finally reunited.

Gopal on the other hand finally becomes a reformed character and rushes to claim the ever-faithful Neela who has been pining away, only to arrive to find his true love dead. The film ends with Gopal lighting Neela's funeral pyre as the rains finally come.

Artwork and Publicity
The much-acclaimed poster and publicity for the movie were illustrated by the master artist Dr S. M. Pandit. One of the posters showing the heroine dangling on the arm of the hero would go on to inspire the R K Studios' famous logo.

Music
The music of Barsaat became famous upon the film's release in 1949. The film was the debut for music directors Shankar Jaikishan and established their careers. The famous playback singer Lata Mangeshkar famously sang for both Nargis and Nimmi in Barsaat.

Actress Bimla Kumari appears swaying in the song 'Hawa mein udta jaaye', the song become very popular as well.

The soundtrack was listed by Planet Bollywood at number 1 on their list of the 100 Greatest Bollywood Soundtracks.
Rakesh Budhu of Planet Bollywood gave 10 stars stating, "Barsaat is ideally one of Hindi cinema's best soundtracks".

Track list

References

External links
 
 Review at Rediff.com
 Barsaat (1949) on YouTube

1940s Hindi-language films
1949 films
Films directed by Raj Kapoor
Films scored by Shankar–Jaikishan
R. K. Films films
Indian black-and-white films
Indian romantic drama films
1949 drama films